St. Thomas More Collegiate, commonly abbreviated as STMC, or just STM, is an independent private school located in Burnaby, British Columbia, Canada.

The school is co-educational, offering academic, fine arts, and business programs, as well as athletic, performing arts, and other extracurricular programs, for students from grades 8 to 12.

The school participates in sporting events under the name of "Knights", with team colors of red, white and black.

History

Beginnings (1957–1985)
In 1957, negotiations began between Most Rev. Martin Michael Johnson, Coadjutor Archbishop of Vancouver, and Rev. Brother A.A. Loftus, Provincial Superior of the Congregation of Christian Brothers in North America, to establish a Catholic high school in the Lower Mainland led by the Christian Brothers. By 1960, an agreement between the Christian Brothers and the Archdiocese of Vancouver was reached, and the construction of a 10-room school was completed.

St. Thomas More Collegiate opened its doors in September 1960, with a total of 110 students enrolled in grades 7, 8 and 9. Over the years, enrollment and staff increased. Major construction was carried out on school facilities in 1966, 1978, 1981, 1984, and 1985.

Reorganization (1985-2009) 

Initially an all-boys school, St. Thomas More Collegiate transitioned to co-education in 1998. Around this time, criminal proceedings began against certain members of the Christian Brothers, some of whom were teaching at STMC. The proceedings were based on allegations of sexual and physical abuse against students at the Mount Cashel Orphanage in Newfoundland. The subsequent lawsuits by Mount Cashel victims threatened to close the school and nearby Vancouver College in 2002 in order to pay financial compensation. After the local community raised $19 million in 2003, the school was spared liquidation. Consequently, the school now operates under a charitable organization known as the STMC Foundation.

Revitalization (2009-2013)
In the summer of 2009, the school began phase one of its revitalization plan, which was to construct a new wing of the school. Completed in May 2010, the new wing, named the StanJean Fine Arts Centre, included six new classrooms, including two specialty classrooms for the school's music program. In addition, the school added a courtyard and renovated the existing kitchen, administration offices, and existing classrooms.

After raising over $6.2 million, a new state-of-the-art double gymnasium was completed to replace the old gymnasium in 2013.

Principals

Presidents

Status 
St. Thomas More Collegiate is classified as a Group 1 school under British Columbia's Independent School Act. It receives 50% of its funding from the Ministry of Education. The school receives no funding for capital costs. The school operates as a non-diocesan school within the Catholic Independent Schools of the Vancouver Archdiocese (CISVA), meaning the school has more independence regarding its policies, curriculum, and tuition fees.

Performance
The St. Thomas More Collegiate curriculum is symbolized by the Knight's Compass, a Celtic cross with a core field of education at each of the four ends and the Catholic faith at the center of the cross.

Academics 
St. Thomas More Collegiate is ranked by the Fraser Institute. In 2017, it was ranked 17th out of 253 schools in British Columbia. The school has consistently been ranked by the Fraser Institute in the top 10% of schools in British Columbia. In the 2017–18 school year, the graduation rate was over 99% and 85% of enrolled students continued on to post-secondary education.

Athletics
The sports teams in the STMC athletic program are known as the "Knights."

STMC is considered to have one of the finest athletics programs in the region. Many elite athletes in football, basketball, wrestling, track & field, swimming and lacrosse have attended STMC. Some athletes have moved on to post-secondary institutions under athletic scholarships and participated at the collegiate, minor and professional levels. Many of the alumni coaches and trainers are former professional athletes themselves.
 (post 1975) Frank Gnup AAA Provincial Championships: Won 3 of 6 appearances

Both the Varsity Boys and Girls basketball teams participate in the BC Catholic Basketball Championship, one of the largest tournaments in the province of BC. The school has a long-lasting rivalry between nearby Catholic schools Vancouver College and Notre Dame Regional Secondary School.

Arts
Despite having earned a reputation as a "jock-oriented" school, it is also recognized for its academic program and its fine and performing arts programs which include instrumental and choral music, vocal jazz, drama, visual arts, and media arts. This program is one of the finest in Canada.

Clubs & groups
With more than 20 clubs, STMC offers a wide variety of clubs and extracurricular activities. STMC is mainly known for their football and basketball clubs, winning several rewards for both.

Student government
Every year, students from each grade level are elected to a student council for the following school year by their peers. The student government organizes school events, such as dances, pep rallies, and fundraisers.

Notable alumni

A. J. Buckley - Actor best known for playing the part of Adam Ross on the hit crime drama CSI: NY.
David Bowman - Former lead singer for the Canadian band soulDecision
Kris Chucko - Professional hockey player for the NHL's Calgary Flames
Jon Cornish - Professional football player for the CFL's Calgary Stampeders
Tyson Craiggs - Former professional football player for the CFL's British Columbia Lions
Anthony DesLauriers - Former professional football player for the CFL's Montreal Allouettes
Curtis Hodgson - Professional lacrosse player for the New Westminster Salmonbellies and the Washington Stealth of the NLL.
Brett Kelly - Actor best known for playing the part of Thurman Merman in Bad Santa.
Adam Krajewski - Former professional football player for the Canadian Football League's Winnipeg Blue Bombers
Calvin McCarty - Professional football player for the CFL's Edmonton Eskimos
Peter Ogilvie - Retired Canadian sprinter who competed at the 1992 and 1996 Summer Olympics.
Richard Stewart - Former British Columbia MLA and currently the Mayor of Coquitlam, British Columbia.
David Sylvester - President and Vice Chancellor of St. Michael's College at the University of Toronto
Kyle Turris - Professional hockey player for the NHL's Nashville Predators.

References

External links
 St. Thomas More Collegiate
STMC Athletics Program

Congregation of Christian Brothers secondary schools
High schools in Burnaby
Catholic secondary schools in British Columbia
Educational institutions established in 1960
1960 establishments in British Columbia